Two ships of the Royal Navy have been named HMS Clematis :

  an  sloop launched in 1915 and sold in 1931
 , a  launched in 1940 and sold in 1949

Royal Navy ship names